Deficit reduction in the United States refers to taxation, spending, and economic policy debates and proposals designed to reduce the Federal budget deficit. Government agencies including the Government Accountability Office (GAO), Congressional Budget Office (CBO), the Office of Management and Budget (OMB), and the U.S. Treasury Department have reported that the federal government is facing a series of important long-run financing challenges, mainly driven by an aging population, rising healthcare costs per person, and rising interest payments on the national debt.

CBO reported in July 2014 that the continuation of present tax and spending policies for the long-run (into the 2030s) results in a budget trajectory that causes debt to grow faster than GDP, which is "unsustainable." Further, CBO reported that high levels of debt relative to GDP may pose significant risks to economic growth and the ability of lawmakers to respond to crises. These risks can be addressed by higher taxes, reduced spending, or combination of both.

The U.S. reported budget surpluses in only four years between 1970-2020, during fiscal years 1998-2001, the last four years budgeted by President Bill Clinton. The Clinton surpluses were due to a combination of a booming economy, higher taxes on the rich implemented in 1993, defense spending restraint, and capital gains tax revenues due to a stock market bubble.

CBO estimated in April 2018 that the national debt would increase between $11.6 trillion and $13.6 trillion over the 2018-2027 period. These estimates are significantly higher than the January 2017 estimate of $9.4 trillion or the June 2017 estimate of $10.1 trillion, which represented the initial budget scenarios inherited by President Trump. The difference is driven by the Tax Cuts and Jobs Act and the Bipartisan Budget Act of 2018. These amounts are on top of the $21 trillion national debt as of April 2018. Debt held by the public, a subset of the overall debt, is expected to rise from 77% GDP in 2017 to over 100% GDP by 2028. The 2017 debt to GDP level ranked 43rd highest out of 207 countries. CBO periodically updates an extensive listing of budget deficit reduction options.

Economists debate the extent to which deficits and debt present a problem, and the best timing and approach for reducing them.  For example, Keynes argued that the time for austerity (deficit reduction through tax increases and spending cuts) was during a booming economy, while increasing the deficit is the right policy prescription during a slump (recession). During the pandemic recession of 2020, several economists argued that deficits and debt reduction were not priorities.

CBO estimated that the U.S. will have a post-WW2 record budget deficit of nearly $4 trillion in fiscal year 2020 (17.9% GDP), due to measures to combat the coronavirus pandemic.

Understanding key terms

A budget deficit refers to expenditures that exceed tax collections during a given period and require borrowing to fund the difference. The U.S. federal government has run annual deficits in 36 of the past 40 fiscal years, with surpluses from 1998–2001. Debt represents the accumulation of deficits over time. Debt held by the public, a partial measure of the U.S. national debt representing securities held by investors, rose in dollar terms each year except during the 1998–2001 surplus period. Total national debt rose in dollar terms each year from 1972–2014.

The budget deficit and debt challenge can be described using various measures:
 Dollars: The 2014 deficit was approximately $486 billion, with tax revenues of $3.0 trillion and spending or outlays of $3.5 trillion. CBO projected in February 2013 that the debt held by the public will rise from $11.3 trillion in 2012 to $18.9 trillion in 2022 under its "baseline scenario," an increase of $7.6 trillion over 10 years. The total national debt will rise from $16 trillion in 2012 to $25 trillion by 2022, an increase of $9 trillion.
 Deficit as percentage of the size of the economy (GDP): The historical average annual deficit pre-2008 was about 3% GDP, with 18% GDP average tax revenues and 21% GDP average expenditures. However, in 2009 the deficit rose to 10% GDP due to a combination of economic conditions and policy choices. It then fell as a % of GDP for five consecutive years back to 2.8% GDP in 2014. With GDP of $16.8 trillion in 2013, 1% GDP represents approximately $170 billion.
 Debt as a percentage of GDP: Debt held by the public ranged between 23% GDP and 50% GDP during the 1971–2007 period, then rose significantly in the wake of the financial crisis and recession, ending FY2014 at about 75% GDP. As of September 30, 2014 debt held by the public was approximately $12.8 trillion. Intra-governmental debt, such as the Social Security trust fund, was at $5.0 trillion, giving a combined public debt or national debt of $17.8 trillion or about 105% GDP. The debt-to-GDP ratio is projected to continue rising if the U.S. continues current policies.
 Unfunded liabilities: This is an actuarial concept used to measure the value in today's dollars of a difference between tax revenue and expenditures for particular programs. This concept is described further below in the sections on Social Security and Medicare.

CBO projections

The Congressional Budget Office (CBO) is a key official source of budget historical information and projections of future revenues, expenses, deficits, and debt under various scenarios.

Overview
John Maynard Keynes wrote that: "The boom, not the slump, is the right time for austerity at the Treasury." In other words, when the economy is doing well (a boom), that is the time to raise taxes and cut spending (austerity, to reduce deficits), while the reverse is applicable when the economy is in recession (a slump), at which time lowering taxes and raising spending (stimulus, to increase deficits) is the proper remedy.

CBO reported in January 2017: "To avoid the negative consequences of high and rising federal debt and to put debt on a sustainable path, lawmakers will have to make significant changes to tax and spending policies—increasing revenues more than they would under current law, reducing spending for large benefit programs below the projected amounts, or adopting some combination of those approaches."

CBO reported in November 2013 that addressing the long-term debt challenge would require reducing future budget deficits. Lawmakers would need to increase revenues further relative to the size of the economy, decrease spending on Social Security or major health care programs relative to current law, cut other federal spending to even lower levels by historical standards, or adopt a combination of these approaches.

CBO reported that: "The amount of deficit reduction that would be needed would depend on lawmakers' objectives for federal debt. For example:
 Decreasing that debt in 2038 to just below 70% GDP—slightly less than what it is now but still quite high by historical standards—could be achieved if deficits were reduced by $2 trillion (excluding interest costs) during the next decade, and the reduction in the deficit as a percentage of output in 2023 was maintained in later years.
 Lowering the debt in 25 years to about 30% GDP—which would be a little below the average over the past 40 years—could be achieved by reducing deficits by $4 trillion (excluding interest costs) during the next decade and maintaining that reduction in subsequent years.
 Achieving savings of $2 trillion or more during the 2014–2023 period would require significant increases in taxes, significant cuts in federal benefits or services, or both."

CBO baseline projections

In January 2017, the Congressional Budget Office reported its baseline budget projections for the 2017–2027 time periods, based on laws in place as of the end of the Obama administration. CBO forecasted that "debt held by the public" would increase from $14.2 trillion in 2016 to $24.9 trillion by 2027, an increase of $10.7 trillion. These increases are primarily driven by an aging population, which impacts the costs of Social Security and Medicare, along with interest on the debt. As President Trump introduces his budgetary policies, the impact can be measured against this baseline.

CBO also estimated that if policies in place as of the end of the Obama administration continued over the following decade, real GDP would grow at approximately 2% per year, the unemployment rate would remain around 5%, inflation would remain around 2%, and interest rates would rise moderately. President Trump's economic policies can also be measured against this baseline.

Budget deficit in FY2017
Fiscal year 2017 (FY2017) ran from October 1, 2016 to September 30, 2017; President Trump was inaugurated in January 2017, so he began office in the fourth month of the fiscal year, which was budgeted by President Obama. In FY2017, the actual budget deficit was $666 billion, $80 billion more than FY2016. FY2017 revenues were up $48 billion (1%) vs. FY2016, while spending was up $128 billion (3%). The deficit was $107 billion more than the CBO January 2017 baseline forecast of $559 billion. The deficit increased to 3.5% GDP, up from 3.2% GDP in 2016 and 2.4% GDP in 2015.

Budget deficit in FY2018
Fiscal year 2018 (FY 2018) ran from October 1, 2017 through September 30, 2018. It was the first fiscal year budgeted by President Trump. The budget deficit increased from $665 billion in 2017 to $779 billion in 2018, an increase of $114 billion or 17%. The budget deficit increased from 3.5% GDP in 2017 to 3.9% GDP in 2018. Compared to the budget deficit of $487 billion forecast for 2018 by CBO just prior to Trump's inauguration, the actual budget deficit was up $292 billion or 60%. This was mainly due to a revenue shortfall of about $275 billion relative to forecast, due to the Tax Cuts and Jobs Act.

Ten year forecasts 2018–2028
The CBO estimated the impact of Trump's tax cuts and separate spending legislation over the 2018–2028 period in their annual "Budget & Economic Outlook", released in April 2018:
 CBO forecasts a stronger economy over the 2018–2019 periods than do many outside economists, blunting some of the deficit impact of the tax cuts and spending increases.
 Real (inflation-adjusted) GDP, a key measure of economic growth, is expected to increase 3.3% in 2018 and 2.4% in 2019, versus 2.6% in 2017. It is projected to average 1.7% from 2020–2026 and 1.8% in 2027–2028.  Over 2017–2027, real GDP is expected to grow 2.0% on average under the April 2018 baseline, versus 1.9% under the June 2017 baseline.
 The non-farm employment level would be about 1.1 million higher on average over the 2018–2028 period, about 0.7% level higher than the June 2017 baseline.
 The budget deficit in fiscal 2018 (which runs from October 1, 2017 to September 30, 2018, the first year budgeted by President Trump) is forecast to be $804 billion, an increase of $139 billion (21%) from the $665 billion in 2017 and up $242 billion (39%) over the previous baseline forecast (June 2017) of $580 billion for 2018.  The June 2017 forecast was essentially the budget trajectory inherited from President Obama; it was prepared prior to the Tax Act and other spending increases under President Trump.
 For the 2018–2027 period, CBO projects the sum of the annual deficits (i.e., debt increase) to be $11.7 trillion, an increase of $1.6 trillion (16%) over the previous baseline (June 2017) forecast of $10.1 trillion.
 The $1.6 trillion debt increase includes three main elements: 1) $1.7 trillion less in revenues due to the tax cuts; 2) $1.0 trillion more in spending; and 3) Partially offsetting incremental revenue of $1.1 trillion due to higher economic growth than previously forecast. The $1.6 trillion figure is approximately $12,700 per family or $4,900 per person total.
 Debt held by the public is expected to rise from 78% of GDP ($16 trillion) at the end of 2018 to 96% GDP ($29 trillion) by 2028. That would be the highest level since the end of World War Two.
 CBO estimated under an alternative scenario (in which policies in place as of April 2018 are maintained beyond scheduled initiation or expiration) that deficits would be considerably higher, rising by $13.7 trillion over the 2018–2027 period, an increase of $3.6 trillion (36%) over the June 2017 baseline forecast. Maintaining current policies for example would include extending the individual Trump tax cuts past their scheduled expiration in 2025, among other changes. The $3.6 trillion figure is approximately $28,500 per household or $11,000 per person total.

The Committee for a Responsible Federal Budget (CRFB) estimated that the legislation passed by the Donald Trump Administration would add significantly to the national debt over the 2018–2028 window, relative to a baseline without that legislation:
 Debt held by the public in 2028 would increase from $27.0 trillion to $29.4 trillion, an increase of $2.4 trillion.
 Debt held by the public as a percent of GDP in 2028 would increase from 93% GDP to 101% GDP.
 Deficits would begin to exceed $1 trillion each year starting with 2019, reaching $1.7 trillion by 2028.
 Deficits would rise from 3.5% GDP in 2017 to 5.3% GDP in 2019 and 5.7% GDP by 2028.
 Under an alternate scenario where the Trump tax cuts for individuals are extended (among other assumptions), the debt would reach $33.0 trillion or 113% GDP in 2028.

Long-term
CBO projected in July 2014 that:
 "The gap between federal spending and revenues would widen after 2015 under the assumptions of the extended baseline...By 2039, the deficit would equal 6.5% GDP, larger than in any year between 1947 and 2008, and federal debt held by the public would reach 106% of GDP, more than in any year except 1946—even without factoring in the economic effects of growing debt."
 "Beyond the next 25 years, the pressures caused by rising budget deficits and debt would become even greater unless laws governing taxes and spending were changed. With deficits as big as the ones that CBO projects, federal debt would be growing faster than GDP, a path that would ultimately be unsustainable."

Risks

There are several risks associated with high and rising debt levels. However, when an economy is growing slowly and unemployment is elevated, there is risk that a budget deficit is too small. When the private sector is unable to grow the economy sufficiently, government spending can make up for the shortfall, although this increases the deficit and debt in the short-run.  Many economists have argued, as Keynes did, that the time for fiscal austerity is during the economic boom, not the bust.

High debt levels
The CBO reported several types of risk factors related to high and rising debt levels in a July 2010 publication:
 A growing portion of savings would go towards purchases of government debt, rather than investments in productive capital goods such as factories and computers, leading to lower output and incomes than would otherwise occur;
 If higher marginal tax rates were used to pay rising interest costs, savings would be reduced and work would be discouraged;
 Rising interest costs would force reductions in important government programs;
 Restrictions to the ability of policymakers to use fiscal policy to respond to economic challenges; and
 An increased risk of a sudden fiscal crisis, in which investors demand higher interest rates.

Risks to economic growth from reducing deficits
Reducing the budget deficit by tax increases or spending cuts may slow economic growth. One example was the United States fiscal cliff which referred to a series of tax increases and spending cuts scheduled to go into effect at the end of 2012. The risks arose primarily from the expiration of the Bush tax cuts and implementation of the Budget Control Act of 2011. CBO projected that economic growth would have slowed considerably in 2013 if the tax hikes and spending cuts had gone into effect, with the 2013 GDP growth rate dropping from +1.7% to -0.5% (causing a mild recession) and higher unemployment. Most of the tax increases were avoided by the American Taxpayer Relief Act, although the spending cuts from the Budget Control Act (also referred to as "the sequester") were not addressed.

Loss of credit rating
A lowered credit rating can result in investors demanding higher interest rates or more difficulty raising funds in global financial markets. On August 5, 2011, S&P made the decision to give a first-ever downgrade to U.S. sovereign debt, lowering the rating one notch to a "AA+" rating, with a negative outlook.  S&P stated that "[w]e lowered our long-term rating on the U.S. because we believe that the prolonged controversy over raising the statutory debt ceiling and the related fiscal policy debate indicate that further near-term progress containing the growth in public spending, especially on entitlements, or on reaching an agreement on raising revenues is less likely than we previously assumed and will remain a contentious and fitful process."

However, despite the lowered credit rating by S&P, other agencies did not follow suit and the U.S. has been able to borrow at record low interest rates through November 2012.

Fiscal crisis and inflation
There is a risk that some investors may someday decide that the deficit or debt is out of control and refuse to invest in U.S. Treasury bonds. This would likely mean that the Federal Reserve would have to purchase them, increasing inflation due to money creation. However, in 2012 both interest rates and inflation were extremely low, indicating this risk was very unlikely to be realized in the short-run. In traditional economic models, inflation becomes more of a risk when the economy is closer to its capacity, because consumers are demanding more goods and services relative to supply, bidding up prices. There is significant slack in the economy since the 2008 crisis began, making inflation unlikely. Further, if the economy strongly picked up and inflation became a risk, the deficit would likely fall due to higher tax revenue and lower safety net costs, lowering the risk of a fiscal crisis.

General strategies for deficit reduction

Strategies for addressing the deficit problem may include policy choices regarding taxation and spending, along with policies designed to increase economic growth and reduce unemployment. These policy decisions may be evaluated in the context of a framework:
 Promote economic growth and employment: A fast-growing economy offers the win-win outcome of a larger proverbial economic pie to divide, with higher employment and tax revenues, lower safety net spending and a lower debt-to-GDP ratio.
 Make equitable trade-offs: Many budget choices have win-lose outcomes, reflecting how government revenues are divided, with some benefiting and others incurring costs. For example, taking away benefits from those in or near retirement may be considered inequitable, while phasing out retirement benefits for younger workers may be considered less so.
 Keep short- and long-term issues in perspective: Healthcare cost inflation and an aging population are the primary long-term deficit drivers. Unemployment and various tax and spending policy choices are the primary short-term deficit drivers. Measures to encourage economic growth today can be implemented along with other measures to reduce future deficits.
 Limit or avoid future spending increases: Policy choices may focus on preventing future increases via freezes or reducing annual rates of increase. Annual growth rates since 2001 in the top three expenditure categories (Healthcare, Social Security, and Defense) are far above the economic growth rate.  In the long-run, expenditures related to healthcare programs such as Medicare and Medicaid are projected to grow faster than the economy overall as the population matures.
 Invest productively: Some spending can be categorized as investments that lower future deficits. For example, if infrastructure, education or R&D investments could make U.S. workers and products more competitive or generate a revenue stream, these could reduce future deficits. Examples might include installing windows that reduce energy costs, toll roads and bridges, or power plants.
 Avoid uncertainty and unnecessary regulation: Complex legislation may create uncertainty regarding future costs of doing business, which affects investment decisions made by businesses and households.
 Implement budget process reforms: Budget rules could be implemented that require new legislation or programs to be funded by either cutting other spending or raising taxes (i.e., "Pay as you go" or PAYGO rules.)

Historically, government spending increased year-over-year in nominal (i.e., unadjusted for inflation) terms from 1971 to 2009. However, by limiting the rate of growth in discretionary spending (defense and non-defense) while growing revenues, the budget was balanced from 1998–2001. From 1990 to 1999, discretionary spending grew by a total of 14%, while revenues grew 77%. In contrast, from 2000–2009, discretionary spending grew by a total of 101% while revenues grew only 4% (see graphic at right). Though a balanced budget is ideal, allowing down payment on debt and more flexibility within government budgeting, limiting deficits to within 1% to 2% of GDP is sufficient to stabilize the debt.

Revenue proposals

Democrats and Republicans mean very different things when they talk about tax reform. Democrats argue for the wealthy to pay more via higher income tax rates, while Republicans focus on lowering income tax rates. While both parties discuss reducing tax expenditures (i.e., exemptions and deductions), Republicans focus on preserving lower tax rates for capital gains and dividends, while Democrats prefer educational credits and capping deductions. Political realities make it unlikely that more than $150 billion per year in individual tax expenditures could be eliminated. One area with more common ground is corporate tax rates, where both parties have generally agreed that lower rates and fewer tax expenditures would align the U.S. more directly with foreign competition.

Historical perspective
Federal tax revenue averaged 17.8% GDP from 1980 to 2007, prior to the Great Recession. From 2008-2018, it averaged 16.4% GDP, due to a combination of a recovering economy, the partial extension of the Bush Tax Cuts (Obama extended roughly 80% of the dollar value) and the Tax Cuts and Jobs Act under President Trump. For scale, 1% GDP represented about $200 billion in 2018, so this 1.4% GDP gap is about $280 billion less tax revenue collected per year relative to the pre-crisis average. Since 1969, the highest level of federal tax receipts was 20% GDP during 2000, and the lowest level was 14.6% GDP in 2009-2010 due to the Great Recession. The budget deficit in 2018 was about $800 billion, while the sum of annual deficits for the 2018-2027 period was estimated at $13.0 trillion, assuming the continuation of policies in place in 2018.

Income tax revenue
CBO estimated in 2018 that increasing individual income tax rates by just 1 percentage point as of January 1, 2019 for some or all tax brackets could bring in $123 billion to $905 billion over the 2019-2028 period: 
All tax brackets: $905 billion.
Four highest brackets: $223 billion.
Two highest brackets: $123 billion.
Raising these rates by more than 1 percentage point would bring in more revenue, but not necessarily in a straight-line calculation.

Actions during Obama Administration

President Obama faced a difficult challenge in 2010, when the Bush tax cuts were initially scheduled to expire. Due to the ongoing Great Recession, he extended those cuts through 2013. During July 2012, he proposed allowing the Bush tax cuts to expire for individual taxpayers earning over $200,000 and couples earning over $250,000, which represents the top 2% of income earners. Reverting to Clinton-era tax rates for these taxpayers would mean increases in the top rates to 36% and 39.6% from 33% and 35%. This would raise approximately $850 billion in revenue over a decade. It would also mean raising the tax rate on investment income, which is highly concentrated among the wealthy, to 20% from 15%.

Allowing the Bush tax cuts to expire at all income levels would have a significant deficit reduction effect. In August 2010, CBO estimated that extending the tax cuts for the 2011–2020 time period would add $3.3 trillion to the national debt: $2.7 trillion in foregone tax revenue plus another $0.7 trillion for interest and debt service costs.

The American Taxpayer Relief Act of 2012 resulted in the expiration of the lower Bush income tax rates for individual taxpayers earning over $400,000 and couples earning over $450,000. This was expected to bring in an additional $600 billion over ten years. In effect, this extended the Bush tax cuts for roughly 80% of their dollar value. By 2015, the budget deficit was 2.4%, below the 1980-2007 historical average of 2.5% GDP.

During 2012, Warren Buffett proposed establishing a minimum effective tax rate of 30% on taxpayers earning over $1 million. This became known as the Buffett Rule. Many high income taxpayers face lower effective tax rates because a significant portion of their income is derived from capital, which is taxed at a lower level than labor. The Tax Policy Center estimated that 217,000 households would be subject to the Buffett rule, with the average tax burden increasing $190,000, a total of approximately $41 billion per year.

Payroll tax revenue and Social Security

The Social Security program faces a 75-year average annual shortfall of 1.4% GDP, which is about $280 billion in 2018 dollars. The CBO publishes a report every few years (Social Security Policy Options) which estimates various ways to close that funding gap. Without changes to the law, benefits will be cut by about 25% in 2034, as outlays to beneficiaries will be limited to the payroll tax collections. Until that time, the Social Security Trust Fund provides the legal authority to force the federal government to borrow to cover the shortfall, but the Trust Fund is reduced to the extent this occurs.

The many revenue alternatives CBO reported for closing the funding gap and reducing the budget deficit included:
Removing the cap on the payroll tax ($128,700 for 2018) without increasing benefits covers 1.0% GDP of the gap, about 70%.
Raising payroll tax contributions by one percentage point now would cover 0.3% of the gap, about 21%. Alternatively, raising payroll tax contributions by two percentage points over 10 years would cover 0.6% of the gap, about 43%.

Corporate income tax revenue

Republicans have argued for a reduction in the corporate income tax rate, from a 35% rate to 25%, which would reduce tax revenues by $1 trillion over ten years.  The corporate income tax rate of 35% is one of the highest compared to other countries. However, U.S. corporate income tax collections of 1.2% GDP in 2011 were lower than nearly all OECD countries (which average 2.5% GDP) and versus U.S. historical levels (2.7% GDP as recently as 2007). U.S. federal corporate income tax revenues have declined relative to profits, falling from approximately 27% in 2000 to 17% in 2012. In comparing corporate taxes, the Congressional Budget Office found in 2005 that the top statutory tax rate was the third highest among OECD countries behind Japan and Germany.  However, the U.S. ranked 27th lowest of 30 OECD countries in its collection of corporate taxes relative to GDP, at 1.8% vs. the average 2.5%.

Corporate tax revenues fell from around $300 billion in 2017 to $200 billion in 2018, a $100 billion or 33% reduction, due to the Tax Cuts and Jobs Act, which reduced the corporate tax rate from 35% to 21%, along with other changes. Corporate tax revenues fell from 1.5% GDP in 2017 to 1.0% GDP in 2018, relative to the 1980-2007 average of 1.8%. CBO reported in 2018 that increasing the corporate tax rate by 1 percentage point would increase revenue collections by $100 billion total for the 2019-2028 period.

Tax expenditures

The term "tax expenditures" refers to income exemptions or deductions that reduce the tax collections that would be made applying a particular tax rate alone. CBO estimated that in fiscal year 2019, the more than 200 tax expenditures will total more than $1.6 trillion annually, nearly twice the size of the budget deficit. Major tax expenditures include: the exclusion from taxable income for employment-based health insurance; exclusion from taxable income for net pension contributions and earnings (e.g., 401k plans); preferential (lower) rates on capital gains and dividends; deferral of profits earned abroad by certain corporations; and deductions for state and local taxes. The top 1% of income earners received about 20% of the benefit of tax expenditures in 2013 (about $320 billion if projected to 2019), while the next 19% received just over 30% (about $500 billion).

Republicans have proposed reducing tax expenditures (i.e., deductions and exemptions) rather than increasing income tax rates. One proposal relates to limiting the amount of income tax deductions that can be claimed. For example, 2012 Presidential Candidate Mitt Romney proposed capping itemized deductions at $25,000, which would add $1.3 trillion to tax revenues over 10 years. Economist Mark Zandi wrote in July 2011 that tax expenditures should be considered a form of government spending.

The Congressional Research Service reported that even though there is more than $1 trillion per year in tax expenditures, it is unlikely that more than $150 billion/year could be cut due to political support for various deductions and exemptions.  For example, according to the Tax Policy Center, the home mortgage interest deduction accounted for $75 billion in foregone revenue in 2011 but over 33 million households (roughly one-third) benefited from it. The Center on Budget and Policy Priorities estimated in April 2013 that approximately 77% of the benefits from the home mortgage deduction go to those earning over $100,000 per year.

Value-added tax (VAT)
Many nations, but not the US, use a national value-added tax or VAT, which is similar conceptually to a national sales tax. Many economists have advocated for a VAT. For example, William Gale and Benjamin Harris proposed a 5 percent VAT, with a $450 per adult and $200 per child annual refund (which is equivalent to the spending of a family making $26,000). They estimated this would raise about $160 billion a year, or 1 percent of GDP.

CBO estimated that a 5 percentage point VAT would collect between $1.9 trillion and $2.9 trillion over the 2019-2028 period, depending on the base of activity to which the tax was applied. Such a tax would be regressive, as it would impact lower income persons relatively more.

Wealth tax
U.S. household and non-profit net worth was estimated at $108.6 trillion as of Q1 2019. This includes the value of real estate and financial assets, less liabilities. The top 1% owned an estimated 40% of this net worth in 2016 (versus 25-30% in the 1980s) or around $40 trillion in 2018.

Senator Elizabeth Warren supports an "Ultra-Millionaire Tax" on the 75,000 richest families in the U.S. (those with incomes greater that $50 million) that would result in an estimated $250 billion per year in federal revenue.

Financial transactions tax
More than $1 trillion in stock and bond value is traded daily in U.S. financial markets. CBO estimated in 2018 that a 0.1% tax on the value of securities traded would bring in an estimated $777 billion total over the 2019-2028 period.

Spending or outlay proposals

Historical perspective

Federal spending (outlays) averaged 20.2% GDP from 1980 to 2007, prior to the Great Recession. From 2008-2018, it averaged 21.5% GDP, with automatic stabilizers (e.g., unemployment insurance, food stamps, and disability) rising with unemployment following the Great Recession. For scale, 1% GDP represented about $200 billion in 2018, so this 1.3% GDP gap is about $260 billion more spending per year on average post-crisis. Spending was held flat each year at around $3.5 trillion from 2009-2014, bringing it back down to the pre-crisis historical average by 2014.  Since 1969, the highest level of federal outlays was 24.4% GDP in 2009, while the lowest was 17.7% GDP in 2000-2001. Outlays in 2018 were 20.3% GDP or $4.1 trillion. Expenditures are classified as mandatory, with payments required by specific laws to those who qualify, or discretionary, with payment amounts renewed annually as part of the budget process.

Defense spending
The military budget of the United States during FY 2018 was approximately $622 billion in expenses for the Department of Defense (DoD) or 3.1% GDP. Defense spending has been falling relative to GDP over the past few decades, from 5.6% GDP in the 1980s, to 3.9% in the 1990s, and 3.7% in the 2000s. CBO has reported numerous options for reducing defense spending, many of which deal with canceling development and production of various defense programs:
Reducing the Department of Defense budget by 10% relative to the amount planned for 2022 would save $517 billion total for the 2019-2028 period, while reducing it 5% would save $248 billion.
Limit growth in the Department of Defense Operations & Maintenance appropriation to the rate of inflation would save $81 billion over the 2019-2028 period, while freezing appropriations for five years and then doing so would save $195 billion.
Reducing funding for naval ship construction to historical levels would save $50 billion over the 2019-2028 period.
Deferring development of B-21 bomber would save $32 billion over 10 years.

Non-defense discretionary spending
Discretionary spending funds the Cabinet Departments and other government agencies. This spending was approximately $566 billion in 2011 or about 4% GDP. This spending has generally ranged between 3.75% GDP and 5.25% GDP since 1971. The spending sequester in the Budget Control Act of 2011 (BCA) essentially freezes non-defense discretionary spending in current dollar terms for the 2013–2022 period, limiting growth to approximately 1.5% per year (about the rate of inflation) versus approximately 6% over the past decade. CBO estimated spending under the sequester from 2012 to 2021 would be $5.4 trillion, versus $5.9 trillion estimated prior to passage of the BCA, an avoidance of about $500 billion in additional spending over a decade.

Mandatory programs

Several government agencies provide budget and debt data and analysis. These include the Government Accountability Office (GAO), the Congressional Budget Office (CBO), the Office of Management and Budget (OMB), and the U.S. Treasury Department. These agencies have reported that the federal government is facing a series of critical long-term financing challenges. This is because expenditures related to mandatory or "entitlement" programs such as Social Security, Medicare, and Medicaid are growing considerably faster than the economy overall, as the population grows older.

These agencies have indicated that under current law, sometime between 2030 and 2040, mandatory spending (primarily Social Security, Medicare, Medicaid, and interest on the national debt) will exceed tax revenue. In other words, all "discretionary" spending (e.g., defense, homeland security, law enforcement, education, etc.) will require borrowing and related deficit spending. These agencies have used such language as "unsustainable" and "trainwreck" to describe such a future.

CBO wrote in November 2012: "The aging of the baby-boom generation portends a significant and sustained increase in coming years in the share of the population that will receive benefits from Social Security and Medicare and long-term care services financed through Medicaid. Moreover, per capita spending on health care is likely to continue to grow faster than per capita spending on other goods and services for many years. Without significant changes in the laws governing Social Security, Medicare, and Medicaid, those factors will boost federal outlays as a percentage of GDP well above the average of the past four decades – a conclusion that applies under any plausible assumptions about future trends in demographics, economic conditions, and health care costs."

Medicare

CBO reported that the primary long-term deficit and debt risk is driven by healthcare costs. For example, CBO projects that Social Security spending will rise from 5.0% GDP in 2012 to 5.4% GDP in 2022 and 6.2% GDP in 2037 and stabilize around that level. However, CBO projects that combined Medicare and Medicaid spending will rise from 5.4% GDP in 2012 to 7.5% GDP by 2022 and 10.4% GDP by 2037 and continue rising thereafter.
 The present value of unfunded obligations under Medicare was $35.6 trillion over a 75-year forecast period (2012–2086), including Medicare Parts A, B and D. The estimated annual shortfall averages 3.2% GDP. Over the infinite horizon, these numbers were $56.3 trillion and 3.8% GDP.

The Patient Protection and Affordable Care Act, also known as "Obamacare," includes cuts of $716 billion in Medicare over a decade, mainly reductions to projected future increases. These cuts would be paid by suppliers of Medicare services such as hospitals, not patients.

Proposals to reduce Medicare costs align with proposals to reduce healthcare costs more generally. Many healthcare reform proposals were made during the Obama administration. Topics included obesity, defensive medicine or tort reform, rationing, a shortage of doctors and nurses, intervention vs. hospice, fraud, and use of imaging technology.

The Medicare Trustees provide an annual report of the program's finances. The forecasts from 2009 and 2015 differ materially, mainly due to changes in the projected rate of healthcare cost increases, which have moderated considerably. Rather than rising to nearly 12% GDP over the forecast period (through 2080) as forecast in 2009, the 2015 forecast has Medicare costs rising to 6% GDP, comparable to the Social Security program. The long-term budget situation has considerably improved in the 2015 forecast versus the 2009 forecast per the Trustees Report.

Social Security

Social Security is facing a long-run shortfall of approximately 1% GDP per year or $155 billion/year in 2012 dollars. Key reform proposals include:
 Removing the cap on the payroll tax. Income over a threshold ($110,100 in 2012) is not subject to the payroll tax, nor are additional benefits paid to those with income above this level. Removing the cap would fund the entire 75-year shortfall.
 Raising the retirement age gradually. Raising the full-benefit retirement age to 70 would fund half the 75-year shortfall.
 Reducing cost of living adjustments (COLA), which are annual payout increases to keep pace with wages. Reducing each year's COLA by 0.5% versus the current formula would fund half the shortfall over 75 years.
 Means testing for wealthier retirees, beyond taxation of benefits which is already arguably a form of means testing.
 Raising the payroll tax rate. Raising the rate by one percentage point would cover half the shortfall for 75 years. Raising the rate by two percentage points gradually over 20 years would cover the entire shortfall.

One way to measure mandatory program risks is in terms of unfunded liabilities, the amount that would have to be set aside today such that principal and interest would cover program shortfalls (spending over tax revenue dedicated to the program). These are measured over a 75-year period and infinite horizon by the program's Trustees:
 The present value of unfunded obligations under Social Security was approximately $8.6 trillion over a 75-year forecast period (2012–2086). The estimated annual shortfall averages 2.5% of the payroll tax base or 0.9% of gross domestic product (a measure of the size of the economy). Measured over the infinite horizon, these figures are $20.5 trillion, 3.9% and 1.3%, respectively.

Raising eligibility ages for Social Security and Medicare
CBO estimated in January 2012 that raising the full retirement age for Social Security from 67 to 70 would reduce outlays by about 13%. Raising the early retirement age from 62 to 64 has little impact, as those who wait longer to begin receiving benefits get a higher amount. Over the long-term, CBO estimates raising the Social Security retirement age increases the size of the workforce and the size of the economy marginally. Raising the Medicare eligibility age from 65 to 67 would reduce Medicare costs by 5%.

Raising the retirement ages in one or both programs brings forth a host of questions around fairness, as some professions are harder to sustain for elderly (e.g., manual labor) and the poor do not have as long a life expectancy as the rich.

Interest expense

Budgeted net interest on the public debt was approximately $245 billion in FY2012 (7% of spending). During FY2012, the government also accrued a non-cash interest expense of $187 billion for intra-governmental debt, primarily the Social Security Trust Fund, for a total interest expense of $432 billion. This accrued interest is added to the Social Security Trust Fund and therefore the national debt each year and will be paid to Social Security recipients in the future. However, since it is a non-cash expense it is excluded from the budget deficit calculation.

Net interest costs paid on the public debt declined from $203 billion in 2011 to $187 billion in 2012 because of lower interest rates. Should these rates return to historical averages, the interest cost would increase dramatically.

During 2013, the U.S. Federal Reserve is expected to purchase about $45 billion of U.S. treasury securities per month in addition to the $40 billion in mortgage debt it's purchasing, effectively absorbing about 90 percent of net new dollar-denominated fixed-income assets. This reduces the supply of bonds available for sale to investors, raising bond prices and lowering interest rates, which helps boost the U.S. economy.  During 2012, global demand for U.S. debt was strong and interest rates were near record lows.

Public debt owned by foreigners has increased to approximately 50% of the total or approximately $3.4 trillion. As a result, nearly 50% of the interest payments are now leaving the country, which is different from past years when interest was paid to U.S. citizens holding the public debt. Interest expenses are projected to grow dramatically as the U.S. debt increases and interest rates rise from very low levels in 2009 to more typical historical levels. CBO estimates that nearly half of the debt increases over the 2009–2019 period will be due to interest.

Should interest rates return to historical averages, the interest cost would increase dramatically. Historian Niall Ferguson described the risk that foreign investors would demand higher interest rates as the U.S. debt levels increase over time in a November 2009 interview.

Economic proposals

In addition to policies regarding revenue and spending, policies that encourage economic growth are the third major way to reduce deficits. Economic growth offers the "win-win" scenario of higher employment, which increases tax revenue while reducing safety net expenditures for such things as unemployment compensation and food stamps. Other deficit proposals related to spending or revenue tend to take money or benefits from one constituency and give it to others, a "win-lose" scenario. Democrats typically advocate Keynesian economics, which involves additional government spending during an economic downturn. Republicans typically advocate Supply-side economics, which involves tax cuts and deregulation to encourage the private sector to increase its spending and investment.

Economic growth and job creation are affected by globalization, technology change or automation, international competition, education levels, demographics, trade policy, and other factors. Cyclical unemployment is due to variation in the economic cycle and is responsive to stimulus measures, while structural unemployment is unrelated to the economic cycle and is unresponsive to stimulus measures. For example, a general reduction in employment across multiple industries would likely be cyclical, while a skills or geographic mismatch for available jobs would be structural issue.

Conservative organizations such as the U.S. Chamber of Commerce have advocated growth and employment strategies based on a reduction in government regulations; empowering state education systems; teacher pay for performance strategies; training programs better focused on available jobs; creation of a private and public infrastructure bank to finance investments; tax rate reductions for corporations; free trade agreements; and reducing labor union power.

Inflation or negative real interest rates
Contrary to popular belief, reducing the debt burden (i.e., lowering the ratio of debt relative to GDP) is almost always accomplished without running budget surpluses. The U.S. has only run surpluses in four of the past 40 years (1998–2001) but had several periods where the debt to GDP ratio was lowered. This was accomplished by growing GDP (in real terms and via inflation) relatively faster than the increase in debt.

Since 2010, the U.S. Treasury has been obtaining negative real interest rates on government debt. Such low rates, outpaced by the inflation rate, occur when the market believes that there are no alternatives with sufficiently low risk, or when popular institutional investments such as insurance companies, pensions, or bond, money market, and balanced mutual funds are required or choose to invest sufficiently large sums in Treasury securities to hedge against risk. Lawrence Summers, Matthew Yglesias and other economists state that at such low rates, government debt borrowing saves taxpayer money, and improves creditworthiness.

In the late 1940s through the early 1970s, the US and UK both reduced their debt burden by about 30% to 40% of GDP per decade by taking advantage of negative real interest rates, but there is no guarantee that government debt rates will continue to stay so low. Between 1946 and 1974, the US debt-to-GDP ration fell from 121% to 32% even though there were surpluses in only eight of those years which were much smaller than the deficits.

Balancing economic growth with deficit reduction
Actions can be taken now to encourage economic growth while implementing measures that reduce future deficits. Ben Bernanke wrote in September 2011: "...the two goals – achieving fiscal sustainability, which is the result of responsible policies set in place for the longer term, and avoiding creation of fiscal headwinds for the recovery – are not incompatible. Acting now to put in place a credible plan for reducing future deficits over the long term, while being attentive to the implications of fiscal choices for the recovery in the near term, can help serve both objectives."

Stimulus vs. austerity

There is significant debate regarding whether lowering the deficit (i.e., fiscal austerity) is the proper economic policy course when unemployment is elevated and economic growth is slow. Economist Laura D'Andrea Tyson wrote in July 2011: "Like many economists, I believe that the immediate crisis facing the United States economy is the jobs deficit, not the budget deficit. The magnitude of the jobs crisis is clearly illustrated by the jobs gap – currently around 12.3 million jobs. That is how many jobs the economy must add to return to its peak employment level before the 2008–09 recession and to absorb the 125,000 people who enter the labor force each month. At the current pace of recovery, the gap will be not closed until 2020 or later." She explained further that job growth between 2000 and 2007 was only half what it had been in the preceding three decades, pointing to several studies by other economists indicating globalization and technology change had highly negative effects on certain sectors of the U.S. workforce and overall wage levels.

Economic policies that stimulate demand (e.g., higher government spending or tax cuts) generally increase employment but raise the deficit as well. Strategies that involve short-term stimulus with longer-term austerity are not mutually exclusive. Steps can be taken in the present that will reduce future spending, such as "bending the curve" on pensions by reducing cost of living adjustments or raising the retirement age for younger members of the population, while at the same time creating short-term spending or tax cut programs to stimulate the economy to create jobs.

IMF managing director Christine Lagarde wrote in August 2011: "For the advanced economies, there is an unmistakable need to restore fiscal sustainability through credible consolidation plans. At the same time we know that slamming on the brakes too quickly will hurt the recovery and worsen job prospects. So fiscal adjustment must resolve the conundrum of being neither too fast nor too slow. Shaping a Goldilocks fiscal consolidation is all about timing. What is needed is a dual focus on medium-term consolidation and short-term support for growth and jobs. That may sound contradictory, but the two are mutually reinforcing. Decisions on future consolidation, tackling the issues that will bring sustained fiscal improvement, create space in the near term for policies that support growth and jobs."

Paul Krugman wrote in August 2011: "What would a real response to our problems involve? First of all, it would involve more, not less, government spending for the time being – with mass unemployment and incredibly low borrowing costs, we should be rebuilding our schools, our roads, our water systems and more. It would involve aggressive moves to reduce household debt via mortgage forgiveness and refinancing. And it would involve an all-out effort by the Federal Reserve to get the economy moving, with the deliberate goal of generating higher inflation to help alleviate debt problems."

Former Treasury Secretary Lawrence Summers mentioned the importance of economic growth and job creation as critical to addressing the deficit issue during July 2011. The President's 2012 budget forecasts annual real GDP growth averaging 3.2% from 2011–2021 (3.7% from 2011–2016 and 2.6% from 2017–2021.) The change in real GDP was -0.3% in 2008, -3.5% in 2009 and +3.0% in 2010. During 2011, real GDP increased at an annual rate of +0.4% during the first quarter and +1.0% during the second quarter.

Federal Reserve Chair Ben Bernanke testified in February 2013 that the Federal government should replace the sequester with smaller spending cuts today and larger cuts in the future, due to concerns the sequester would slow the economy. He reminded lawmakers of the CBO's guidance that recent austerity measures were projected to reduce economic growth by up to 1.5 percentage points in 2013 (relative to what it would have been otherwise), of which 0.6 percentage points related to the sequester. Bernanke stated that the long-run fiscal issues mainly related to an aging population and healthcare costs. He wrote: "To address both the near- and longer-term [fiscal] issues, the Congress and the Administration should consider replacing the sharp, front-loaded spending cuts required by the sequestration with policies that reduce the federal deficit more gradually in the near term but more substantially in the longer run. Such an approach could lessen the near-term fiscal headwinds facing the recovery while more effectively addressing the longer-term imbalances in the federal budget."

Job creation sectors
Economist Michael Spence said in August 2011 that over the 1990–2008 period, job creation was almost entirely in the "non-tradable" sector, which produces goods and services that must be consumed domestically, like healthcare, and few jobs created in the "tradable" sector which produces goods that can be sold internationally, like manufacturing. He falsely claimed that job creation in both sectors is necessary and that various factors, such as the housing bubble, hid the lack of job creation in the tradable sector. He stated: "We're going to have to try to fix the ineffective parts of our educational system...We're under-investing in things like infrastructure...we've just been living on consumption and we need to live a little bit more on investment, including public-sector investment." He also advocated tax policy changes to encourage hiring of U.S. workers.

Income inequality
Economist Robert Reich wrote in September 2011 that political policies have resulted in relatively stagnant U.S. wages for the middle class since 1979 and record income inequality. Despite more women entering the workforce to provide a second family incomes, U.S. consumption became increasingly debt-financed and unsustainable. He advocated higher taxation on the wealthy, stronger safety nets, strengthening labor unions (which represented less than 8% of the private labor force), Medicare for all, raising the average wages in trading partner countries, and a focus on education.

Economist Joseph Stiglitz wrote in 2012 that moving money from the bottom to the top of the income spectrum through income inequality lowers consumption, and therefore economic growth and job creation.  Higher-income individuals consume a smaller proportion of their income than do lower-income individuals; those at the top save 15–25% of their income, while those at the bottom spend all of their income. This can reduce the tax revenue the government collects, raising the deficit relative to an economy with more income equality.

Reducing fractional reserve lending
The International Monetary Fund published a working paper entitled The Chicago Plan Revisited suggesting that the debt could be eliminated by raising bank reserve requirements, converting from fractional reserve banking to full reserve banking. Economists at the Paris School of Economics have commented on the plan, stating that it is already the status quo for coinage currency, and a Norges Bank economist has examined the proposal in the context of considering the finance industry as part of the real economy. A Centre for Economic Policy Research paper agrees with the conclusion that, "no real liability is created by new fiat money creation, and therefore public debt does not rise as a result."

Specific deficit reduction proposals

National Research Council
During January 2010, the National Research Council and the National Academy of Public Administration reported a series of strategies to address the problem. They included four scenarios designed to prevent the public debt to GDP ratio from exceeding 60%:

Allowing laws already on the books to take effect

As of November 2014, there was no major legislation scheduled to expire or take effect projected by CBO to have a material net impact on the budget deficit. However, an unusual situation developed in early 2013, referred to as the fiscal cliff, in which the Bush tax cuts of 2001 and 2003 were scheduled to expire (causing income tax revenues to rise significantly) and spending cuts due to the Budget Control Act of 2011 (also known as "the sequester") were scheduled to begin taking effect. CBO estimated allowing those laws to take effect would have dramatically reduced the deficit over a decade, but also would have slowed the economy and increased unemployment at a time when the economy was recovering from the subprime mortgage crisis.

Specifically, allowing laws on the books in 2011 to take effect would have reduced future debts by up to $7.1 trillion over a decade:
 $3.3T from letting temporary income and estate tax cuts enacted in 2001, 2003, 2009, and 2010 (some of which were known as the Bush tax cuts to expire on schedule at the end of 2012;
 $1.2T from implementing the sequester (spending freezes / reductions) in the Budget Control Act of 2011);
 $0.8T other temporary tax cut expirations (the "extenders" that Congress has regularly extended on a "temporary" basis) expire on schedule;
 $0.3T from letting cuts in Medicare physician reimbursements scheduled under current law (required under the Medicare Sustainable Growth Rate formula enacted in 1997, but which have been postponed since 2003) take effect (i.e., no longer applying the Doc fix);
 $0.7T from letting the temporary increase in the exemption amount under the Alternative Minimum Tax expire, thereby returning the exemption to the level in effect in 2001;
 $0.9T in lower interest payments on the debt as a result of the deficit reduction achieved from not extending these current policies.

CBO reported in November 2012: "Under the current-law assumptions embodied in CBO's baseline projections, the budget deficit would shrink markedly – from nearly $1.1 trillion in fiscal year 2012 to about $200 billion in 2022 – and debt would decline to 58 percent of GDP in 2022. However, those projections depend heavily on the significant increases in taxes and decreases in spending that are scheduled to take effect at the beginning of January [2013]."

The fiscal cliff was partially resolved by the American Taxpayer Relief Act of 2012 or ATRA, which extended the Bush tax cuts for the bottom 99% of income earners, resulting in considerably less deficit reduction than if they had been allowed to expire at all income levels according to CBO. Further, the sequester was delayed for two months but contributed to moderately lower defense and non-defense discretionary spending in 2013 and beyond versus the 2011 law baseline.

Raising income tax rates for the bottom 99% of income earners to their pre-2001 levels would require entirely new legislation. The sequester was implemented, so reversing its impact would also require new legislation.

CBO budget options reports
CBO publishes a report annually ("Options for Reducing the Deficit") with an extensive list of policy options and their impact on the deficit. CBO reported in November 2013 that addressing the long-term debt challenge would require reducing future budget deficits. Lawmakers would need to increase revenues further relative to the size of the economy, decrease spending on Social Security or major health care programs relative to current law, cut other federal spending to even lower levels by historical standards, or adopt a combination of these approaches.

Republican proposals

Rep. Paul Ryan (R) has proposed the Roadmap for America's Future, which is a series of budgetary reforms. His January 2010 version of the plan includes partial privatization of Social Security, the transition of Medicare to a voucher system, discretionary spending cuts and freezes, and tax reform. A series of graphs and charts summarizing the impact of the plan are included. Economists have both praised and criticized particular features of the plan. The CBO also did a partial evaluation of the bill. The Center for Budget and Policy Priorities (CBPP) was very critical of the Roadmap. Rep. Ryan provided a response to the CBPP's analysis.

The House of Representatives Committee on the Budget, chaired by Paul Ryan, released a budget resolution in April 2011, titled The Path to Prosperity: Restoring America's Promise. The Path focuses on tax reform (lowering income tax rates and reducing tax expenditures or loopholes); spending cuts and controls; and redesign of the Medicare and Medicaid programs. It does not propose significant changes to Social Security. The CBO did an analysis of the resolution (a less rigorous evaluation than full scoring of legislation), estimating that the Path would balance the budget by 2030 and reduce the level of debt held by the public to 10% GDP by 2050, vs. 62% in 2010. The Path assumes revenue collection of 19% GDP after 2022, up from the current 15% GDP and closer to the historical average of 18.3% GDP. A grouping of spending categories called "Other Mandatory and Defense and Non-Defense Discretionary spending" would be reduced from 12% GDP in 2010 to 3.5% by 2050. Economist Paul Krugman called it "ridiculous and heartless" due to a combination of income tax rate reductions (which he argued mainly benefit the wealthy) and large spending cuts that would affect the poor and middle classes.

The Republican Party website includes an alternative budget proposal provided to the President in January 2010. It includes lower taxes, lower annual increases in entitlement spending growth, and marginally higher defense spending than the President's 2011 budget proposal. During September 2010, Republicans published "A Pledge to America" which advocated a repeal of recent healthcare legislation, reduced spending and the size of government, and tax reductions. The NYT editorial board was very critical of the Pledge, stating: "...[The Pledge] offers a laundry list of spending-cut proposals, none of which are up to the scale of the problem, and many that cannot be taken seriously."

Fiscal reform commission

President Obama established a budget reform commission, the National Commission on Fiscal Responsibility and Reform, during February, 2010. The Commission "shall propose recommendations designed to balance the budget, excluding interest payments on the debt, by 2015. This result is projected to stabilize the debt-to-GDP ratio at an acceptable level once the economy recovers." Unfortunately the Commission was unable to garner the required supermajority of its members in support of its proposals, and disbanded without issuing an official report to Congress. The final, failed draft report, which received 11 of the required 14 votes for approval, was released to the public in December 2010.

The Commission released a draft of its proposals on November 10, 2010. It included various tax and spend adjustments to bring long-run government tax revenue and spending into line at approximately 21% of GDP. For fiscal year 2009, tax revenues were approximately 15% of GDP and spending was 24% of GDP. The Co-chairs summary of the plan states that it:
 Achieves nearly $4 trillion in deficit reduction through 2020 via 50+ specific ways to cut outdated programs and strengthen competitiveness by making Washington cut and invest, not borrow and spend.
 Reduces the deficit to 2.2% of GDP by 2015, exceeding President's goal of primary balance (about 3% of GDP).
 Reduces tax rates, abolishes the alternative minimum tax, and cuts backdoor spending (e.g., mortgage interest deductions) in the tax code.
 Stabilizes debt by 2014 and reduces debt to 60% of GDP by 2024 and 40% by 2037.
 Ensures lasting Social Security solvency, prevents projected 22% cuts in 2037, reduces elderly poverty, and distributes burden fairly.

The Center on Budget and Policy Priorities evaluated the draft plan, praising that it "puts everything on the table" but criticizing that it "lacks an appropriate balance between program cuts and revenue increases."

President Obama's proposals

Budgets and April 2011 proposal
President Obama outlined his strategy for reducing future deficits in April 2011 and explained why this debate is important: "...as the Baby Boomers start to retire in greater numbers and health care costs continue to rise, the situation will get even worse. By 2025, the amount of taxes we currently pay will only be enough to finance our health care programs – Medicare and Medicaid – Social Security, and the interest we owe on our debt. That's it. Every other national priority – education, transportation, even our national security – will have to be paid for with borrowed money." He warned that interest payments may reach $1 trillion annually by the end of the decade.

He outlined core principles of his proposal, which includes investments in key areas while reducing future expenditures. "I will not sacrifice the core investments that we need to grow and create jobs. We will invest in medical research. We will invest in clean energy technology. We will invest in new roads and airports and broadband access. We will invest in education. We will invest in job training. We will do what we need to do to compete, and we will win the future." He outlined his proposals for reducing future deficits, by:
 Reducing non-defense discretionary spending, by freezing or limiting increases in future spending;
 Finding savings in the defense budget, building on $400 billion in savings already identified by Defense Secretary Gates;
 Reducing healthcare spending, by reducing subsidies and erroneous payments, negotiating for lower prescription drug prices and use of generics, improving efficiencies in the Medicaid program, altering doctor incentives, and empowering a panel of experts to recommend cost-effective treatments and solutions;
 Strengthening the Social Security program, without reducing commitments to current or future retirees (by implication revenue increases); and
 Raising revenues, primarily by raising taxes on the wealthy and reducing certain types of tax expenditures.

President Obama's actual 2012 budget proposal was defeated in the Senate by a margin of 0–97 votes.

September 2011 proposal
President Obama announced a 10-year (2012–2021) plan in September 2011 called: "Living Within Our Means and Investing in the Future: The President's Plan for Economic Growth and Deficit Reduction." The plan included tax increases on the wealthy, along with cuts in future spending on defense and Medicare.  Social Security was excluded from the plan. The plan included $3,670 billion in deficit reduction over 10 years, offset by  $447 billion in deficit increases (spending and tax cuts) for the proposed American Jobs Act, for a net deficit reduction of $3,222 billion. If the recently passed Budget Control Act of 2011 is included, this adds another $1,180 billion in deficit reduction for a total of $4,403 billion. Plan estimates indicate that if all these measures were implemented, the deficit in 2021 would be 2.3% GDP or $565 billion. Key categories of savings over the 10 years included in the $3,670 billion are:
 Mandatory program savings $257B;
 Health savings $320B;
 Reduction in military spending related to the wars $1,084B;
 Tax increases and reform of $1,573B; and
 Interest cost avoidance $436B.

The Center on Budget and Policy Priorities supported the proposal, stating: "President Obama proposed a balanced and well-designed package today that would boost economic growth and jobs in the short run while stabilizing federal debt as a share of the economy after 2013. By keeping federal debt held by the public from growing as a share of the economy, the President's proposal would meet the definition of a 'sustainable budget' that economists often use."

Congressional Progressive Caucus "The People's Budget"
The Congressional Progressive Caucus (CPC) consists of 75 members of the House of Representatives and one senator. It proposed "The People's Budget" in April 2011, which includes the following recommendations, which it claims would balance the budget by 2021 while maintaining debt as a % GDP under 65%:
 Reversing most of the Bush tax cuts;
 Reinstating historical marginal income tax rates of approximately 45% on income earners over $1 million and 49% for earners over $1 billion.
 Taxing capital gains and qualified dividends as ordinary income;
 Raising the income tax cap ($106,800) on the Social Security payroll tax;
 Restoring the estate tax;
 Reducing tax subsidies for corporations, particularly in the oil and gas industries;
 Ending overseas contingency defense spending for the wars in Iraq and Afghanistan;
 Reducing defense spending overall and reducing the U.S. global defense footprint;
 Investing in a jobs program; and
 Implementing a public option to reduce healthcare costs.

The Economic Policy Institute, a liberal think tank, evaluated the proposal. The Economist also discussed it. Economist Paul Krugman wrote in April 2011: "It's worth pointing out that if you want to balance the budget in 10 years, you pretty much must do it largely by cutting defense and raising taxes; you can't make huge cuts in the rest of the budget without inflicting extreme pain on millions of Americans."

Private "think-tank" proposals
The Peter G. Peterson Foundation solicited proposals from six organizations, which included the American Enterprise Institute, the Bipartisan Policy Center, the Center for American Progress, the Economic Policy Institute, The Heritage Foundation, and the Roosevelt Institute Campus Network.  These proposals were reviewed by a former CBO director and the Tax Policy Institute to provide a common scoring mechanism. The recommendations of each group were reported in May 2011.

The Bipartisan Policy Center sponsored a Debt Reduction Task Force, co-chaired by Pete V. Domenici and Alice M. Rivlin. This panel created a report called "Restoring America's Future," which was published in November 2010. The plan claimed to stabilize the debt to GDP ratio at 60%, with up to $6 trillion in debt reduction over the 2011–2020 period. Specific plan elements included:
 Freeze defense spending for 5 years, after which defense spending would be held to the rate of GDP growth;
 Freeze non-defense discretionary spending for 4 years, after which it would be capped at the rate of GDP growth;
 Reduce the current six income tax rates to just two (15% and 27%). It would reduce the corporate tax rate to 27% from 35% today. The panel would also eliminate most tax expenditures (roughly $1 trillion per year), with the exception of the mortgage interest and charitable deductions.
 Implement a national sales tax or value-added tax (VAT), starting at 3% in 2012 and rising to 6.5% by 2013.
 Reform Social Security, by raising the cap on the payroll tax, reducing the annual cost of living adjustment, and reducing benefits for those who retire early.

Commentary

CBO perspective
The CBO reported in September 2011 that: "Given the aging of the population and rising costs for health care, attaining a sustainable federal budget will require the United States to deviate from the policies of the past 40 years in at least one of the following ways:
 Raise federal revenues significantly above their average share of GDP;
 Make major changes to the sorts of benefits provided for Americans when they become older; or
 Substantially reduce the role of the rest of the federal government relative to the size of the economy."

During testimony before the Congressional Joint Deficit Reduction Committee in September 2011, CBO Director Douglas Elmendorf counseled members of Congress to make decisions about the role of the federal government, then make policy choices to obtain the revenue necessary to fund those roles, to put the U.S. on a sustainable fiscal path.

General strategies
In January 2008, then GAO Director David Walker presented a strategy for addressing what he called the federal budget "burning platform" and "unsustainable fiscal policy." This included improved financial reporting to better capture the obligations of the government; public education; improved budgetary and legislative processes, such as "pay as you go" rules; the restructure of entitlement programs and tax policy; and creation of a bi-partisan fiscal reform commission. He pointed to four types of "deficits" that make up the problem: budget, trade, savings and leadership.

Then OMB Director Peter Orszag stated in a November 2009 interview: "It's very popular to complain about the deficit, but then many of the specific steps that you could take to address it are unpopular. And that is the fundamental challenge that we are facing, and that we need help both from the American public and Congress in addressing." He characterized the budget problem in two parts: a short- to medium-term problem related to the financial crisis of 2007–2010, which has reduced tax revenues significantly and involved large stimulus spending; and a long-term problem primarily driven by increasing healthcare costs per person. He argued that the U.S. cannot return to a sustainable long-term fiscal path by either tax increases or cuts to non-healthcare cost categories alone; the U.S. must confront the rising healthcare costs driving expenditures in the Medicare and Medicaid programs.

Fareed Zakaria said in February 2010: "But, in one sense, Washington is delivering to the American people exactly what they seem to want. In poll after poll, we find that the public is generally opposed to any new taxes, but we also discover that the public will immediately punish anyone who proposes spending cuts in any middle class program which are the ones where the money is in the federal budget. Now, there is only one way to square this circle short of magic, and that is to borrow money, and that is what we have done for decades now at the local, state and federal level...So, the next time you accuse Washington of being irresponsible, save some of that blame for yourself and your friends."

Andrew Sullivan said in March 2010: "...the biggest problem in this country is...they're big babies. I mean, people keep saying they don't want any tax increases, but they don't want to have their Medicare cut, they don't want to have their Medicaid [cut] or they don't want to have their Social Security touched an inch. Well, it's about time someone tells them, you can't have it, baby...You have to make a choice. And I fear that—and I always thought, you see, that that was the Conservative position. The Conservative is the Grinch who says no. And, in some ways, I think this in the long run, looking back in history, was Reagan's greatest bad legacy, which is he tried to tell people you can have it all. We can't have it all."

Harvard historian Niall Ferguson stated in a November 2009 interview: "The United States is on an unsustainable fiscal path. And we know that path ends in one of two ways; you either default on that debt, or you depreciate it away. You inflate it away with your currency effectively." He said the most likely case is that the U.S. would default on its entitlement obligations for Social Security and Medicare first, by reducing the obligations through entitlement reform. He also warned about the risk that foreign investors would demand a higher interest rate to purchase U.S. debt, damaging U.S. growth prospects.

In May 2011, the Wells Fargo Economics Group wrote that: "The failure to control spending will result in some combination of higher inflation, higher interest rates, a weaker dollar, weaker economic growth and, hence, a lower standard of living in the United States..." Thomas Friedman wrote in September 2011: "But as long as every solution that is hard is off the table, then our slow national decline will remain on the table."

U.S. media
Major American journalists typically assume that cutting the federal deficit is generally the correct policy, according to Ezra Klein. According to Klein, there is an elite consensus on this issue, and the usual journalistic ideal of objectivity in reporting, presenting dispassionately both sides of a major issue of public policy, is not applied to deficit reduction.

Healthcare cost control
Economist Paul Krugman has recommended a series of policy and economic actions to address the budget deficit. He wrote in February 2011: "What would a serious approach to our fiscal problems involve? I can summarize it in seven words: health care, health care, health care, revenue...Long-run projections suggest that spending on the major entitlement programs will rise sharply over the decades ahead, but the great bulk of that rise will come from the health insurance programs, not Social Security. So anyone who is really serious about the budget should be focusing mainly on health care...[by] getting behind specific actions to rein in costs."

Taxation and spending reforms
Economist Nouriel Roubini wrote in May 2010: "There are only two solutions to the sovereign debt crisis — raise taxes or cut spending — but the political gridlock may prevent either from happening...In the US, the average tax burden as a share of GDP is much lower than in other advanced economies. The right adjustment for the US would be to phase in revenue increases gradually over time so that you don't kill the recovery while controlling the growth of government spending."

David Leonhardt wrote in The New York Times in March 2010: "For now, political leaders in both parties are still in denial about what the solution will entail. To be fair, so is much of the public. What needs to happen? Spending will need to be cut, and taxes will need to rise. They won't need to rise just on households making more than $250,000, as Mr. Obama has suggested. They will probably need to rise on your household, however much you make...A solution that relied only on spending cuts would dismantle some bedrock parts of modern American society...A solution that relied only on taxes would muzzle economic growth."

Fed Chair Ben Bernanke stated in January 2007: "The longer we wait, the more severe, the more draconian, the more difficult the objectives are going to be. I think the right time to start was about 10 years ago." Bernanke wrote in April 2010: "Thus, the reality is that the Congress, the Administration, and the American people will have to choose among making modifications to entitlement programs such as Medicare and Social Security, restraining federal spending on everything else, accepting higher taxes, or some combination thereof."

Journalist Steven Pearlstein advocated in May 2010 a comprehensive series of budgetary reforms. These included: Spending caps on Medicare and Medicaid; gradually raising the eligibility age for Social Security and Medicare; limiting discretionary spending increases to the rate of inflation; and imposing a value-added tax. Journalist Robert J. Samuelson also recommended a ten-point deficit reduction plan.

Public opinion polls
According to a December 2012 Pew Research Center poll, only a few of the frequently discussed deficit reduction ideas have majority support:
 69% support raising the tax rate on income over $250,000.
 54% support limiting deductions taxpayers can claim.
 52% support raising the tax on investment income.
 51% support reducing Medicare payments to high-income seniors.
 51% support reducing Social Security payments to high-income seniors.

Fewer than 50% support raising the retirement age for Social Security or Medicare, reducing military defense spending, limiting the mortgage interest deduction, or reducing federal funding for low income persons, education and infrastructure.

According to a CBS News/New York Times poll in July 2009, 56% of people were opposed to paying more taxes to reduce the deficit and 53% were also opposed to cutting spending. According to a Pew Research poll in June 2009, there was no single category of spending that a majority of Americans favored cutting. Only cuts in foreign aid (less than 1% of the budget), polled higher than 33%. Economist Bruce Bartlett wrote in December 2009: "Nevertheless, I can't really blame members of Congress for lacking the courage or responsibility to get the budget under some semblance of control. All the evidence suggests that they are just doing what voters want them to do, which is nothing."

A Bloomberg/Selzer national poll conducted in December 2009 indicated that more than two-thirds of Americans favored tax increases on the rich (individuals making over $500,000) to help solve the deficit problem. Further, an across-the-board 5% cut in all federal discretionary spending would be supported by 57%; this category is about 30% of federal spending. Only 26% favored tax increases on the middle class and only 23% favored reducing the growth rate in entitlements, such as Social Security.

A Rasmussen Reports survey in February 2010 showed that only 35% of voters correctly believe that the majority of federal spending goes to just defense, Social Security and Medicare. Forty-four percent (44%) say it's not true, and 20% are not sure.

A January 2010 Rasmussen report showed that overall, 57% would like to see a cut in government spending, 23% favor a freeze, and 12% say the government should increase spending. Republicans and unaffiliated voters overwhelmingly favor spending cuts. Democrats are evenly divided between spending cuts and a spending freeze.

According to a Pew Research poll in March 2010, 31% of Republicans would be willing to decrease military spending to bring down the deficit. A majority of Democrats (55%) and 46% of Independents say they would accept cuts in military spending to reduce the deficit.

A National Journal poll in February 2012 reported: "When asked to identify the biggest reason the federal government faces large deficits for the coming years, just 3 percent of those surveyed said it was because of 'too much government spending on programs for the elderly'; only 14 percent said the principal reason was 'too much government spending on programs for poor people.' Those explanations were dwarfed by the 24 percent who attributed the deficits primarily to excessive defense spending, and the 46 percent plurality who said their principal cause was that 'wealthy Americans don't pay enough in taxes.'  While minorities were more likely than whites to pin the blame on the wealthy avoiding taxes, even 43 percent of whites agreed."

A September 2012 survey by The Economist found those earning over $100,000 annually were twice as likely to name the budget deficit as the most important issue in deciding how they would vote than middle- or lower-income respondents. Among the general public, about 40% say unemployment is the most important issue while 25% say that the budget deficit is.

See also
 United States public debt
 United States fiscal cliff
 2011 U.S. debt ceiling crisis
 Starve the beast (policy)
 Government budget by country
 I.O.U.S.A., documentary film by Patrick Creadon
 Modern Monetary Theory
 Unemployment in the United States
 List of U.S. state budgets
 Continuing resolution
 Appropriations bill (United States)

Relevant Acts of Congress include:
Deficit Reduction Act of 1984
Gramm-Rudman-Hollings Balanced Budget and Emergency Deficit Control Act of 1985
Omnibus Budget Reconciliation Act of 1993
Deficit Reduction Act of 2005

References

External links
 CBO – Choices for Deficit Reduction. November 2012

United States federal budgets